Legaria is a town and municipality located in the province and autonomous community of Navarre, northern Spain. A stream passes on the north side of the town. Nearby towns are Ancín and Murieta.

References

External links 
 LEGARIA in the Bernardo Estornés Lasa - Auñamendi Encyclopedia (Euskomedia Fundazioa) 

Municipalities in Navarre